"Dixeya" nasuta is a species of the predatory gorgonopsian therapsids from the Late Permian of East Africa, known from fossils found in what is now Tanzania. The species has a complicated taxonomic history, it was originally named as a second species of the genus Dixeya which is now considered a junior synonym of Aelurognathus. "D." nasuta itself, however, was not moved to Aelurognathus, and although it was instead tentatively referred to Arctognathus at first it has since been recognised to not belong to this genus either. This situation leaves "Dixeya" nasuta without a formal genus name. It was proposed to belong to a new distinct genus, named "Njalila", that was informally proposed for the species in a PhD thesis, but this name has not yet been formally published and is currently a nomen nudum. "D." nasuta has been characterised from other gorgonopsians by a combination of its straight snout profile, upturned and 'pinched' nose, and curved jaw margin.

Description
Compared with similarly short-snouted gorgonopsians (such as Arctognathus and Eriphostoma) the skull is not as wide at the rear, with only weakly flaring zygomatic arches and little constriction of the snout behind the canines. As such, its skull appears much more straight-sided when viewed from above, and is also generally wider than it is tall. Similarly, the profile of the skull along the top of the snout is also largely straight, although the tip is characteristically turned up in a sharp point above the nostrils, which were positioned far-forwards on the snout. The snout is also distinctive for its unusual 'pinched' appearance. The nasal bones along the top of the snout are broad, but are constricted along the middle. Furthermore, the septomaxilla (a small bone found in and around the nostrils of therapsids) bulges strongly outwards under and behind the nostrils but then rapidly hollows out just behind them on either side, giving the bridge of the nose the pinched appearance.

Behind the snout, the roof of the skull is slightly concave and the rims of the orbits are noticeably raised above it. The orbits themselves are proportionately large and rounded, and face laterally out to the sides. The temporal fenestra, a hole in the skull behind the eye socket for jaw muscle attachment, is also very large. Subsequently, the bony arches surrounding and separating these openings (e.g. the suborbital arch, postorbital bar) are proportionately slender and thin. The parietal foramen ("third eye" opening) on top of the skull is large and surrounded by a raised boss of bone, and is positioned at the very back of the skull right above the occiput. The occiput itself (the back face of the skull) is tall and roughly rectangular in shape, slightly concave and only gently sloping.

As in other gorgonopsians, "D." nasuta has large blade-like caniniform teeth. The incisor teeth (five in each premaxilla), however, are smaller than those of related gorgonopsians, and it only had four to five small postcanine teeth. The jawline of the maxilla in the upper jaw is notably convex, with a much more exaggerated curve of the toothrow than in other gorgonopsians except for Arctognathus. This exaggerated curvature is due to the post-canine teeth being housed in a raised bony flange of the maxilla behind the canines. The maxilla also has an unusual groove over the postcanine teeth, starting shallowly above the first postcanine and running down to the edge of the bone behind the 5th postcanine, deepening along its length. Like other gorgonopsians "D." nasuta also possessed palatal teeth, three on each palatine and two on each pterygoid bones, with only weakly developed bosses supporting them. The vomer on the roof of the mouth is very broad at the front, but narrows rapidly to a constricted splint halfway down its length. This more resembles the vomer of the derived rubidgeines than the narrower vomer of earlier gorgonopsians. The vomer sports three ridges, one down its middle and two running along each edge.

The dentary bone of the lower jaw is comparatively slender, with a sloping mandibular symphysis that nonetheless bears the characteristic 'chin' of gorgonopsians. The reflected lamina of the angular bone towards the back of the jaw is only moderately ridged, in comparison to other gorgonopsians.

History
"Dixeya" nasuta was originally named by German paleontologist Friedrich von Huene in 1950 from two skulls collected from the Usili Formation (formerly known as K6 or the Kawinga Formation) in the Ruhuhu Basin of Tanzania; GPIT/RE/7118 (designated the holotype specimen) and GPIT/RE/7119. Von Huene had erected these specimens as second species of Dixeya, a genus coined in 1927 by Sidney H. Haughton for its type species D. quadrata. In 1970, paleontologist Denise Sigogneau-Russell re-assigned D. quadrata to Aelurognathus (as A. quadrata) in her systematic revision of gorgonopsian taxonomy, thus synonymising the two genera. However, she did not consider von Huene's D. nasuta to belong to Aelurognathus, and instead tentatively referred the species to Arctognathus as Arctognathus? nasuta. Furthermore, Sigogneau (1970) only considered the holotype of D. quadrata from Malawi to belong to Aelurognathus, and she did not consider two additional specimens referred to D. quadrata by von Huene in 1950 from Tanzania (GPIT/RE/7120 and GPIT/RE/7121) to belong to the same species. Instead, she suggested that they may also be referable to Arctognathus? nasuta—in addition to three other Tanzanian specimens (MZC 886, MZC 887, and MZC 876) referred to D. quadrata by Francis Rex Parrington in 1955. Nonetheless, Sigogneau was cautious in the referral of "D." nasuta to Arctognathus, and had previously acknowledged that the referral was not a resolved matter, especially in her opinion that the roof of the skull of "D." nasuta was not well preserved enough for comparison.

Later researchers agreed with Sigogneau's doubts and have acknowledged that "D." nasuta does not compare well to Arctognathus. In Eva Gebauer's unpublished 2007 Ph.D. thesis, she argued that "D." nasuta was distinct from other gorgonopsians and belonged to a new genus for which she informally proposed the nomen nudum "Njalila" (named after the Njalila, a tributary of the Rhuhu River in Tanzania). Gebauer further proposed a novel second species of this genus, "N. insigna", based on a skull previously referred to another gorgonopsian, Scylacops capensis. Gebauer differentiated "N. insigna" from "N." nasuta by possessing thicker arches between its skull openings, a posteriorly wider skull, and a slightly more rounded snout profile. In 2014, paleontologist Christian F. Kammerer also agreed that "D." nasuta was not a species of Arctognathus, as well as that the Tanzanian specimens of D. quadrata likely belonged to this same species. However, he was more cautious regarding their taxonomy, noting that Gebauer's proposal of a novel genus required further study of the material and needed to be more rigorously phylogenetically tested first. From this, he urged that the taxon should be referred to as "Dixeya" nasuta until its taxonomy and relations could be resolved (reportedly under study as of 2014).

Classification
The phylogenetic relationships of "Dixeya" nasuta (as "Njalila") were analysed by Gebauer in 2007 in her unpublished PhD thesis, and was the first computerised phylogenetic analysis of gorgonopsians ever conducted. Gebauer found "D." nasuta as a member of the family Gorgonopsidae, which in her classification excluded the most basal genera of gorgonopsians in her tree that she regarded as plesiomorphic (i.e. representing the ancestral condition) for the group. Within Gorgonopsidae, "D." nasuta was a relatively derived member but outside of the clade including the giant and derived Rubidgeinae and Inostrancevia, occupying part of an evolutionary grade between them and more ancestral gorgonopsids.

The results of Gebauer (2007) are depicted in the cladogram below (with notes reflecting notable taxonomic and nomenclatural changes that have occurred in the years since):

The analysis of Gebauer (2007) was the first major attempt to perform a phylogenetic analysis of gorgonopsians, however its results have not been borne out by subsequent independent analyses. Namely, Kammerer (2016) regarded Gebauer's analysis as "unsatisfactory", citing that many of the characters used by her analysis were based upon skull proportions that are variable within taxa, both individually and ontogenetically (i.e. traits that change through growth). As an example of a potential problem created by this, he highlighted the basal position of Aloposaurus (a wastebasket taxon of various immature gorgonopsians) compared to the stratigraphically older and morphologically basal Eoarctops (now a junior synonym of Eriphostoma) being found in a relatively more derived position.

"D." nasuta has yet to be included in any later phylogenetic analyses of gorgonopsians, and in 2014 Kammerer commented that both its generic status and phylogenetic relationships amongst other gorgonopsians needed further study pending a full re-description before a generic assignment could be made.

Notes

References

Gorgonopsia
Prehistoric therapsid genera
Fossils of Tanzania
Lopingian synapsids of Africa
Lopingian genus first appearances
Lopingian genus extinctions
Nomina nuda